is a train station in Suma-ku, Kobe, Hyōgo Prefecture, Japan.

Lines
Sanyo Electric Railway
Main Line (SY 01)
Hanshin Electric Railway
Kōbe Kosoku Line (HS 39)

Both lines have through operations via this station.

Adjacent stations

Railway stations in Hyōgo Prefecture
Railway stations in Japan opened in 1910